Do Me Again is the fourth studio album by American singer Freddie Jackson, released by Capitol Records in 1990. The album became Jackson's fourth consecutive effort to top the US Top R&B/Hip-Hop Albums, and went gold in the US.

Critical reception
The Boston Globe wrote that "once again, Freddie Jackson gently massages our earlobes with several highly suggestive ditties that would make Barry White blush." Ebony deemed the album "steamy" and "a musical feast." The Baltimore Sun wrote that "where [Luther] Vandross likes to power through his love songs, Jackson invariably takes a lighter touch, and that's what makes his Do Me Again worth replaying."

The Rolling Stone Album Guide called Do Me Again Jackson's best album since his debut, giving much of the credit to the return of mentor Paul Laurence.

Track listing

Personnel and credits 
Musicians

 Freddie Jackson – lead and backing vocals 
 Barry J. Eastmond – keyboards (1, 2, 5, 8, 9), drum programming (1, 2, 5, 8, 9), arrangements (1, 2, 5, 8, 9)
 Eric Rehl – synthesizers (1, 2, 5, 8, 9)
 Paul Laurence – keyboards (3, 7, 10), programming (3, 7, 10), arrangements (3, 7, 10), additional programming (6), backing vocals (7)
 James McKinney – keyboards (4, 6), programming (4, 6), arrangements (6)
 Darryl Shepherd – keyboards (4), programming (4)
 DLA – keyboards (7), programming (7)
 Tyrone Holmes – keyboards (10), programming (10), backing vocals (10)
 Michael Day – keyboards (11), backing vocals (11), arrangements (11)
 Billy "Spaceman" Patterson – guitar (1)
 Mike Campbell – guitar (2, 4, 8)
 Rohn Lawrence – guitar (5)
 Ira Siegel – guitar (9)
 Joel Kipnis – guitar (11), guitar synthesizer (11), drum and percussion programming (11), arrangements (11)
 Anthony Jackson – bass (2)
 Najee – saxophone solo (2)
 Danny Wilensky – alto saxophone (9)
 Yolanda Lee – backing vocals (1, 2, 3, 5-8)
 Nikki Richards – backing vocals (1, 2, 5, 8)
 Steve Abram – backing vocals (2, 5)
 Audrey Wheeler – backing vocals (3)
 Janice Dempsey – backing vocals (4)
 Clifford Jameson – backing vocals (6)
 Maria Liuzzo – backing vocals (7)
 Lillo Thomas – backing vocals (7)
 Jenny Peters – backing vocals (10)
 Rocky Maffit – backing vocals (11), arrangements (11)

Charts

Weekly charts

Year-end charts

Certifications

References

External links
 Do Me Again at Discogs

1990 albums
Freddie Jackson albums
Capitol Records albums